Famous and Fearless is a reality game show series in which 8 celebrities compete in extreme sporting events to win money for their respective chosen charity. It aired in January 2011 on Channel 4 and was presented by Chris Evans and Clare Balding with Jack Osbourne appearing alongside them as a guest in most shows. The commentator of the events was Nick Fellows. The winner was Charley Boorman. The live part of Famous and Fearless was broadcast from the Liverpool Echo Arena, where all the Head-to-Heads and other events happened before an arena audience.

Celebrities
Eight celebrities competed, split into two divisions – boys and girls. On 7 January 2011, Charley Boorman won the boys' group and Kelly Holmes won the girls, with the former becoming the overall champion.

Events
Day 1
BMX (Boys)
Streetluge (Girls)
Car Flip (Head to Head)

Day 2
Mini Moto (Girls)
Powerboat (Boys)
Monster Truck Assault Course (Head to Head)

Day 3
Inline speed skating (Boys)
Hovercraft (Girls)
Demolition Derby (Head to Head)

Day 4
Power Skateboarding (Girls)
Enduro (Boys)
Car Crash Dominoes (Head to Head)

Day 5
Karting (Boys)
Abseil (Girls)
Car Jump (Head to Head)

Day 6 (Finale)
Powerbocking (Girls)
Dirt Buggy (Boys)
Demolition Derby (Head to Head)

Charley Boorman beat Dame Kelly Holmes in Demolition Derby to become the eventual winner of Famous And Fearless.

Reception
Famous and Fearless received mostly negative reviews from British media outlets. Stuart Heritage of The Guardian stated that the contestants were not celebrities and the events were not extreme. He went on to say Celebrity Big Brother's successor may have been more successful if it had been 'a mindless Saturday evening ITV show.'. The Independent claimed the show was too noisy and mislead viewers with its title, suggesting 'Vaguely Recognisable and Game for a Laugh' or 'Who's That and Why Is That Dangerous?' as more fitting titles.

Ratings

Cancellation
In February 2011, it was reported that the series had been axed after one series due to poor ratings.

References

External links

2010s British reality television series
2011 British television series debuts
2011 British television series endings
Channel 4 original programming
English-language television shows
Television series by Endemol